Wantok FM is a national radio station in the Solomon Islands, operated by the Solomon Islands Broadcasting Corporation. It broadcasts from Honiara.

The station has a partnership with the Australian Broadcasting Corporation, broadcasting the latter's programmes as well as its own.

Wantok is a Pijin word which comes from the English "one talk", and means people who speak the same language, belong to the same culture, are friends and help one another out.

References

Radio stations in the Solomon Islands